Henry Tyndale School is a special school located in Farnborough, Hampshire, England, catering for pupils of all academic ages (2-19).  The main building accommodates 100 pupils up to Year 11, with a further 15 pupils in a purpose-built Sixth form college.

OFSTED inspections
In May 2009, following a periodic Ofsted inspection, the school received an "Outstanding" assessment, building on the assessment of "Good with Outstanding Features" in 2006.

In December 2011, the "Outstanding" assessment was confirmed.

Awards
Enhanced Healthy Schools Status (July 2009)

In addition, the school is working towards
Sing Up - Silver Award

South and South East in Bloom - School Grounds 
2009 - Gold Award and Overall Winner
2008 - Gold Award

References

External links
Henry Tyndale School website
Henry Tyndale School entry on Hampshire County Council website (Hantsweb)

Special schools in Hampshire
Farnborough, Hampshire
Community schools in Hampshire